Mycobacterium chitae is a species of the phylum Actinomycetota (Gram-positive bacteria with high guanine and cytosine content, one of the dominant phyla of all bacteria), belonging to the genus Mycobacterium.

Type strain: strain ATCC 19627 = CCUG 39504 = CIP 105383 = DSM 44633 = JCM 12403 = NCTC 10485.

References

SKERMAN (V.B.D.), McGOWAN (V.) and SNEATH (P.H.A.) (editors): Approved Lists of Bacterial Names. Int. J. Syst. Bacteriol., 1980, 30, 225–420. [TSUKAMURA (M.): Mycobacterium chitae: a new species. Japanese Journal of Microbiology, 1967, 11, 43–47.]

External links
Type strain of Mycobacterium chitae at BacDive -  the Bacterial Diversity Metadatabase

Acid-fast bacilli
chitae
Bacteria described in 1967